Jacob Brown may refer to:
Jacob Brown (general) (1775–1828), American officer during the War of 1812
Jacob Brown (Texas soldier) (1789–1846), American soldier
J. Hay Brown (1849–1930), American judge from Pennsylvania
Jacob Brown (footballer) (born 1998), Scottish footballer, for Stoke City

See also 
 List of people with surname Brown